Les Patineurs (French, literally The Skaters) may refer to:

Les Patineurs (ballet), a ballet arranged by Constant Lambert from music by Giacomo Meyerbeer
Les Patineurs (waltz),  a waltz by Émile Waldteufel

See also
 Skater (disambiguation)